Hamdard-e-Sehat is a Pakistani Urdu health journal founded by Hakeem Abdul Hameed in 1931 in Delhi. Later in 1940, his younger brother Hakeem Muhammad Saeed became its editor. When Hakeem Saeed migrated to Pakistan in 1948, he published Hamdard-e-Sehat from Karachi. In 1953, Masood Ahmed Barkati was appointed as its admin editor, and he remained so till his death in 2017.

Hamdard-e-Sehat aims at providing latest news and updates in the field of health and medical research for the Urdu readers. Apart from medical science, articles on psychological wellness, social issues, and book reviews are also included in the journal.

See also
 List of magazines in Pakistan

References

External links

 

1931 establishments in India
Health magazines
Magazines established in 1931
Urdu-language magazines
Magazines published in Delhi
Mass media in Karachi